Hainan is the smallest and southernmost province of the People's Republic of China (PRC), consisting of various islands in the South China Sea. , the largest and most populous island in China, makes up the vast majority (97%) of the province. The name means "south of the sea", reflecting the island's position south of the Qiongzhou Strait, which separates it from Leizhou Peninsula and the China mainland.

It was part of Guangdong from 1950–88, after which it was made a province of its own and was designated as a special economic zone by Deng Xiaoping, as part of the Chinese economic reform program.

Indigenous peoples like the Hlai, a Kra–Dai-speaking ethnic group, are native to the island and comprise 15% of the population. Their native languages include the Hlai languages. The Hlai are recognized by the Chinese government as one of the country's 56 ethnic groups. The Chinese population, who compose a majority of the population at 82%, speak a wide variety of languages including Standard Chinese, Hainam Min, Yue Chinese, Cantonese, Hakka Chinese, etc. Speakers of Be, despite speaking a Kra-Dai language, are reckoned officially as ethnically Chinese. Hainan is also home to the Jiamao language, of disputed provenance. 

There are ten major cities and ten counties in Hainan Province. The capital of the province is Haikou, on the northern coast of Hainan Island, while Sanya is a well-known tourist destination on the southern coast. The other major cities are Wenchang, Sansha, Qionghai, Wanning, Wuzhishan, Dongfang and Danzhou.

According to China's territorial claims, several controversial territories in the South China Sea, including the Spratly Islands (Nansha) and Paracel Islands (Xisha), are administered under Sansha city of the province. However, many of these islands are also claimed and de facto controlled by other countries, such as Philippines and Vietnam.

In 2020, a large-scale plan was announced by the Chinese government to transform the entire island province into a free trade port, with the aim of turning it into the largest free-trade port in the world by 2035. The plan involves building a hub for offshore financing and duty free shopping, as well as using lower taxes and reduced visa requirements to help draw in foreign businesses and tourists. Moreover, all goods sold from Hainan to other parts of China would be treated as imports since 2025.

Names
The provincial name derives from its major island, Hainan, in Hainanese "Hai Nam", which is named after its position south of the Qiongzhou Strait. (To the north of the strait, the Leizhou Peninsula in Guangdong is also known as Haibei/Hai Bac or "North of the Sea".) Former names for Hainan Island include Zhuya, Qiongya, and Qiongzhou.

During the 17th and 18th centuries, explorers referred to the island as "Aynam", which remains the pronunciation of its name in the local Hainanese dialect.

History

Prehistoric era
According to some scholars, Hainan was originally attached to the Northeastern part of what is now Vietnam; however, the island was formed after it physically broke away from Vietnam due to a volcanic eruption and drifted southeast near China after the Mesozoic, millions of years ago.

The Baiyue people are among the earliest Kra-Dai residents to arrive on Hainan island. They are believed to have settled there at least 2 to 6 thousand years ago, and carry genetic markers from ancient people who reached the island between 7 and 27 thousand years ago.

Imperial Era
Hainan Island was recorded by Chinese mandarin officials in 110 BC, when the Han dynasty of China established a military garrison there following the arrival of General Lu Bode. Han citizens, including military personnel and civil servants began to migrate to Hainan Island from the mainland. For centuries, imperial courts exiled criminals and political dissidents to Hainan island and what is now northern Vietnam, both of which were parts of Guangdong province most of the time during various Chinese dynasties, to toil under the tropical heat. One of the most famous exiled persons is Su Shi, an intellectual, gifted poet, and Song dynasty bureaucrat, who offended many of his colleagues and superiors in the royal court. Su Shi wrote extensively about his exiled experiences on the island during the 11th century AD. After the 11th century AD, more and more poor peasants looked for land and moved from other parts of the Guangdong province to Leizhou peninsula and Hainan island, pushing the indigenous Li people, one of the various Bai-Yue tribes in southern China, into the highlands of the southern half of the island.

Republic of China

Hainan was historically part of Guangdong and Guangxi Provinces and as such was the Qiongya Circuit under the 1912 establishment of the Republic of China. In 1921, it was planned to become a special administrative region; in 1944, it became Hainan Special Administrative Region with 16 counties, including the South China Sea Islands.

During the 1920s and 30s, Hainan was a hotbed of banditry, many opposition politicians were hanged, therefore opposition politicians went into hiding. The Communists and the indigenous Hlai people fought a vigorous guerrilla campaign against the Japanese, who were only able to occupy some Hainan territories; but in retaliation the Japanese launched numerous massacres against Hlai villages. Feng Baiju led the Hainan Independent Column of fighters throughout the 1930s and 1940s. After the Japanese surrender in 1945, the Kuomintang reestablished control. Hainan was one of the last areas to eventually come under the administration of the People's Republic, having been under the control of ROC forces until March 1950. The People's Republic attacked Hainan on April 10, 1950 and attained complete control on May 1.

People's Republic of China
On 1 May 1950, under the People's Republic of China, the Hainan Special Administrative Region became an Administrative Region Office, a branch of the Guangdong provincial government. During the mid-1980s, when Hainan Island was still part of Guangdong Province, a fourteen-month episode of marketing zeal by Hainan Special District Administrator Lei Yu put Hainan's pursuit of provincial status under a cloud. It involved the duty-free imports from Hong Kong of 90,000 Japanese-made cars and trucks at a cost of ¥ 4.5 billion (US$1.5 billion), and exporting them – with the help of local naval units – to the mainland, making 150% profits. By comparison, only 10,000 vehicles were imported into Hainan since 1950. In addition, it involved further consignments of 2.9 million TV sets, 252,000 videocassette recorders & 122,000 motorcycles. The money was taken from the 1983 central government funds destined for the construction of the island's transportation infrastructure (roads, railways, airports, harbors) over the next ten years.

On 1 October 1984, it became the Hainan Administrative Region, with a People's Government, and finally as province separate from Guangdong four years later. In 1988, when the island was made a separate province, it was designated a Special Economic Zone in an effort to increase investment.

The central government funds were deemed insufficient by the Hainan authorities for the construction of the island's other infrastructures (water works, power stations, telecommunications, etc.) and had taken a very liberal interpretation of the economic and trade regulations for Hainan and thirteen coastal cities; the regulations did not mention on prohibiting the re-selling of second-hand goods. Some of the proceeds, from unsold units, were later retrieved by the central government to re-finance the special district.

In June 2020, China announced a master plan for Hainan's free trade port system. Announced by state-owned media Xinhua News Agency, "Hainan will “basically establish a free trade port system by 2025 and become more mature by 2035.” South China Morning Post described such an initiative as an effort of PRC to "replace Hong Kong as the trading entrepôt" while Cheng Shi, of ICBC International has refused to accept such a claim. Additionally, experts have raised concern about the question of compliance of global trading practices particularly for this project.

Geography

The area of Hainan Island (97% of the province) is slightly smaller than that of Taiwan Island. To the west of Hainan Island is the Gulf of Tonkin.

The northern half of Hainan is covered with the ancient Hainan Volcanic Field. Beneath the topsoil is volcanic rock while the topsoil itself contains small pieces of this vesicular rock.
 
Wetland covers 320,000 hectares, 78,000 hectares of which were created artificially. Most of this is located in the eastern and northern part of Hainan.

Rivers and lakes
Most of the rivers in Hainan originate in the central area of the island and flow radially in different directions. Other major rivers include the Wanquan River at -long in the east, Changhua River in the west, and the Sanya River in the south. Evaporation during the dry season around the coastal areas greatly reduces the flow of the rivers.

There are very few natural lakes in Hainan. However, there are numerous reservoirs, the largest of which is the Songtao Reservoir in the central-north area.

Islands

Nearby islands
Several small islands exist around the coast of Hainan Island:
Haidian Island, on the north coast, is part of Haikou City
Nanwan Monkey Island, in actuality a peninsula
Phoenix Island is an artificial resort island currently under construction in Sanya Bay.
Wuzhizhou Island is located within Haitang Bay
Xinbu Island is located directly to the east of Haidian Island

Due to their close proximity to the main island, the flora, fauna, and the climate are very similar.

Disputed islands

A number of small islands, which are located hundreds of kilometers to the south, are claimed and administrated by Sansha as part of Hainan Province. Sovereignty of these islands is however disputed. These islands include:

Paracel Islands Xisha Islands – "The West-sands" – claimed by Vietnam, the PRC and the Republic of China (Taiwan, ROC)
Money Island, Paracel Islands
Rocky Island, South China Sea
Tree Island, South China Sea
Triton Island
Woody Island, South China Sea
Zhongsha Islands – "The Middle-sands"
Spratly Islands – Nansha Islands – "The South-sands" are subject to claims by Vietnam, the PRC, ROC, Malaysia, the Philippines, and Brunei.
Spratly Island
Flat Island (Spratly)
Taiping Island
James Shoal (southernmost point)
Loaita Island
Namyit Island
Nanshan Island
Sin Cowe Island
Thitu Island
West York Island

Environment
Compared to most of mainland China, the air quality of Hainan is significantly better since it is not affected by factory pollution, which has adversely affected the air on the mainland. Throughout 2012, Hainan had the highest air quality in the country for 351 days.

The provincial government's environmental protection campaign has taken action against a number of industrial plants. During 2012, several outdated manufacturing facilities had their business licenses revoked, and 175 cases related to illegal sewage discharge were handled.

Total sulfur dioxide emissions for the province were 34,000 tons in 2012, a 3 percent year-on-year reduction. In 2011, smog emissions were reduced 6.3 percent to 15,000 tons.

Province-wide infrastructure development

From 2015 to the present, a widespread program to improve cities and other settlements in Hainan island has been taking place. It includes the removal of litter from towns, villages, and many roadsides. Small, illegal dumps are being removed. However, illegal dumping of construction debris still occurs on rural roads. Large, plastic dumpsters have been put in place within villages and at countryside road intersections. Towns are being improved with new road and sidewalk surfaces, landscaping features are being created, and many buildings are receiving new façades.

This initiative in Haikou has seen entire neighborhoods demolished and rebuilt, sanitation improved, illegal structures used for business removed, roadside vendors banned, roads and sidewalks replaced, and new street crossings with traffic lights installed.

Climate

The climate of Hainan is mostly tropical. The island's two largest cities, Haikou and Sanya, both possess a tropical Köppen climate. Except for the mountainous regions in the central part of the island, the daily average temperature in Hainan in all months is well above .

The summer in the northern part is hotter and). Parts of Hainan lie in the path of typhoons, and 70% of the annual precipitation is derived from typhoons and the summer rainy season. Major flooding occurs due to typhoons, which can cause many problems for local residents.

Annual fog
From January to February, the island of Hainan is often affected by thick fog, particularly in coastal areas and the northern part of the island. This is caused by cold winter air from the north coming into contact with the warmer sea, causing the moisture that evaporates from the sea to be condensed into fog. The fog remains from day to night, and is evenly distributed. During this period, residents normally keep windows shut. The moisture in the air is so extreme that the walls in homes weep, and floors often accumulate a layer of water.

Flora and fauna

However, due to an invasion of exotic species, human impact from tourism, deforestation, and the release of pollutants, many species are under threat. A report from the Department of Land, Environment and Resources of Hainan Province states that 200 species are near extinction, with 6 species, such as Maytenus hainanensis and Sciaphila tenella already extinct.

Flora
The majority of Hainan's land mass is forest with 61.5 percent coverage (210,000 hectares) reported at the end of 2012, an increase of  since 2011. A further  grass and trees were planted along the province's highways.

There are 53 genera in 29 families of wild and cultivated fruit growing on Hainan Island. There are few large trees on the island; coconut palms are very common along with other smaller trees. Most of Hainan Island is however covered by forest.

Notable species include:
 Hainan yellow lantern chili is a pepper similar to the scotch bonnet.
 Hainan white pine, a species of tree.
 Cephalotaxus hainanensis is a species of plum-yew.

Fauna
There are numerous protected areas and wildlife preserves on the island. Animals that are ubiquitous throughout the island include frogs, toads, geckos, skinks, and butterflies. Present, but less commonly observed, are snakes (Asian palm pit vipers, red bamboo snake, and occasionally cobras), Siberian chipmunks, squirrels, and the masked palm civet. Almost no large animals remain in the wild. The lakes are largely populated with carp and catfish.

There are 362 known bird species. Seabirds such as gulls are not generally seen. Egrets and Black-winged kites are common in agricultural areas. Similar to many subtropical areas, insect species are diverse, and mosquitoes are very common.

In the ocean, sea turtles and whale sharks are known to migrate in these waters.

Hainan island has rich bio-diversity of cetaceans and is the site of studying these in Chinese waters. Many whales such as North Pacific right whales, western gray whales, humpback whales, and blue whales (all of these are almost extinct in Chinese waters) were historically seen in the winter and spring to mate and calve. These gentle giants of the sea had been hunted heavily and were wiped out by Japanese whalers (established whaling stations on various sites on Chinese and Korean coasts including Hainan and Daya Bay). A few Bryde's whales and minke whales may still occur in the adjacent waters along with on Leizhou Peninsula and the Gulf of Tonkin. Smaller species of whale and dolphins, such as short-finned pilot whales and pantropical spotted dolphins, but most notably the endangered Chinese white dolphin. Declared sanctuary for the species extends along the coasts. These dolphins may appear among clearer waters such as vicinity to Sanya.

Dugongs still occur in small number, mostly on Gulf of Tonkin side.

Notable species include:

 Hainan gymnure (Neohylomys hainanensis or Hainan moonrat) is a small mammal.
 Hainan partridge (Arborophila ardens) is a species of bird endemic to Hainan Island.
 Hainan peacock-pheasant (Polyplectron katsumatae) is an endangered species of the family Phasianidae.
 Hainan black crested gibbon (Nomascus hainanus) is one of the world's most endangered primates. Seacology, a non-profit organization in Berkeley, California, United States, initiated a project to protect the highly endangered Hainan gibbon in exchange for scholarships for the children of four villages near Hainan Bawangling National Nature Reserve.
 Hainan hare (Lepus hainanus) is a species of hare endemic to Hainan.
 A subspecies of the leopard cat (Prionailurus bengalensis alleni) is endemic to Hainan.
 Hainan leaf-warbler (Phylloscopus hainanus) is an Old World warbler in the family Phylloscopidae.
 Little torrent frog (Amolops torrentis) is a species of frog found only on Hainan Island.

Demographics

The population density of Hainan is low compared to most coastal Chinese provinces.

In 2000, the ethnic groups of Hainan included the Han-Chinese Hainanese, who are the majority (84% of the population) and speak the Min language, the Li (Hlai) (14.7% of the population); the Miao (0.7%) and the Zhuang (0.6%). The Li are the largest indigenous group on the island in terms of population. Also found on the island are the Utsuls, descendants of Cham refugees, who are classified as Hui by the Chinese government because of their Islamic religion. There is a Tanka community that live at Sanya Bay.

The Li people mainly reside in the nine cities and counties in the middle and southern part of Hainan – the cities of Sanya, Wuzhishan and Dongfang, the Li autonomous counties of Baisha, Lingshui, Ledong, Changjiang, and the 'Li and Miao Autonomous Counties of Qiongzhong and Baoting'. Some others live elsewhere on Hainan with other ethnic groups in Danzhou, Wanning, Qionghai, Lingshui and Tunchang. The area inhabited by the Li ethnic group totals , about 55 percent of the province's total.

Although they are indigenous to the island and do not speak a Chinese language, the Limgao (Ong-Be) people near the capital (8% of the Hainan population) are counted as Han Chinese by the Chinese government.

Religion

Most of the Hainanese population practices Chinese folk religion and Chinese Buddhism. The Li population has a Theravada Buddhist minority. Most of the Utsuls of the island, a branch of Cham people living near Sanya, are Muslims. Because Hainan was a point in the travel route of missionaries, there are some Christians. According to the Chinese General Social Survey of 2009, Christians constitute 0.48% of the province's population.

Nanshan Park is the center of Buddhism on Hainan. The site includes countless grand temples, statues and spiritual gardens the likes of Savior Garden and Longevity Valley, with intricately trimmed hedges and abundant in lotus flowers, a venerated symbol in Buddhism meaning virtue or purity.

At the heart of the valley is the grand Nanshan Temple, its gates flanked by stone figures of Buddha in front of the Tang dynasty-style entrance. The interior displays images of the Four Heavenly Kings amid statues of other deities enshrined in renderings of stone, gold and jade.

Perhaps the most popular site within the Nanshan Buddhist Cultural Zone is the awe-inspiring stone rendering of the Bodhisattva Guan Yin, emerging out of the South China Sea to stand at 108 meters, taller than the Statue of Liberty.

The Nanshan Buddhist Cultural Zone is visited by thousands of tourists and pilgrims each year who come pay homage to the site that plays a significant role in the religion in China and to sample some of the finest Buddhist vegan cuisine on the island.

Languages
Most people in Hainan speak a variety of Min Chinese known as Hainanese. Other Chinese varieties and non-Chinese languages are spoken as well:

 Standard Mandarin (Putonghua) is widely known as in the rest of China. Mandarin is especially common in the city of Sanya.
 In Yacheng City (as well as its vicinity several dozen miles west of Huihui and Huixin), the so-called military speech dialect of Mandarin (the official language of the southwest among the northern Chinese dialects) is spoken.
 Cantonese is spoken by some, particularly in Haikou.
 In Yanglan Village in the northeast, two Min dialects, both closely related to Cantonese, are spoken: the Mai dialect and the Danzhou dialect, spoken in Haipo Village in the south, which is the same dialect as the dialect spoken in Danzhou in Dan Country in the northern part of the island. 
 The Li, Zhuang and Limgao speak Tai–Kadai languages. 
 The Miao speak Hmong–Mien languages. 
 There are roughly 4,500 Utsul people living in the villages of Yanglan and Huixin, two villages on the outskirts of Sanya. They speak the Tsat language, a member of the Austronesian Chamic languages.

Sociolinguistics 
Standard Mandarin serves as a lingua franca between different ethnic groups. Adults who are members of a minority also have quite high literacy skills in Chinese. Most adults speak several Chinese dialects, and some also speak Li.

When Chams interact with the Hainanese dialect speakers from within Hainan Province, they use the Hainanese dialect, though youngsters generally use Mandarin. Not many can communicate in Li, so the Hainanese dialect or Mandarin is often used.

In the market place and within the Sanya Municipality, the Cham speakers use Cham among themselves, and with others mostly use the Hainanese dialect. However, in the market places near the government seat of Yanglan Township, the Chams either use the Hainanese dialect or the Mai dialect.

Life expectancy and longevity
The people of Hainan live longer than those on the mainland. At the end of 2017, there were 1,565 centenarians in Hainan. For every 100,000 people in the province, 17.13 were centenarians. As of 8 March 2018, there were 287,700 residents over 80 years of age, making up 3.15% of the population.

Government

Even while Hainan Island was a part of Guangdong it had a considerable amount of local autonomy; the southern half of the island was an autonomous prefecture. Hainan's elevation to provincial level in 1988 increased its accountability to the Central People's Government, but by designating the new province a special economic zone the central government expressed its intent to allow Hainan maximum flexibility in devising programs to facilitate foreign investment and economic growth. Administratively, the province has been divided into five economic major districts.

Politics

The politics of Hainan is structured in a dual party-government system like all other governing institutions in mainland China.

The Governor of Hainan is the highest-ranking official in the People's Government of Hainan. However, in the province's dual party-government governing system, the Governor has less power than the Hainan Chinese Communist Party Provincial Committee Secretary or CCP Party Chief. The current Hainan Party Chief is Shen Xiaoming.

Legislation
On 13 April 1988, the First Session of the Seventh National People's Congress decided to establish Hainan Province, and at the same time granted the Hainan Provincial People's Congress and its Standing Committee special legislative power. 
After the 2019 free trade port plan is proposed, Hainan can enact legislation in economic, cultural, local affairs, social management, etc., and implement it in the Hainan Free Trade Zone (port).

Intelligence
Per the research conducted by Information Warfare Monitor, Hainan is the physical location of GhostNet. The Chinese government has officially denied the existence of a cyber war and intelligence apparatus.

Administrative
In the official PRC territorial claim, Hainan Province includes not just one island, but also some two hundred South China Sea Islands. While the containment of the South China Sea Islands means that Hainan Province has a very large water body, it has a disproportionally small land area. James Shoal (Zēngmǔ Ànshā), which is presently marked by the PRC, signifies the country's southernmost border. But Malaysia also claims that it is on their continental shelf.

Subdivisions

Hainan Province uses a slightly different administrative system than the other provinces of China. Most other provinces are divided entirely into prefecture-level divisions, each of which is then divided entirely into county-level divisions. County-level divisions generally do not come directly under the province. In Hainan, nearly all county-level divisions (the eight districts excepted) come directly under the province. This method of division is due to Hainan's relatively sparse population, totaling 9.26 million as of 2017.

Urban areas

Military base

Hainan Island is home to the People's Liberation Army Navy Hainan Submarine Base and strategic nuclear submarine naval harbor at Yalong Bay. The caverns are capable of hiding up to 20 nuclear submarines from spy satellites. The harbor houses nuclear ballistic missile submarines and is large enough to accommodate aircraft carriers. The U.S. Department of Defense has estimated that China will have five type 094 submarines operational by 2010 with each capable of carrying 12 JL-2 ballistic missiles. Two  piers and three smaller ones would be enough to accommodate two carrier strike groups or amphibious assault ships.

Economy

Hainan's economy is predominantly agricultural, and more than a half of the island's exports are agricultural products. Hainan's elevation to province-level status (1988), however, was accompanied by its designation as China's largest "special economic zone", the intent being to hasten the development of the island's plentiful resources. Prior to this, the province had a reputation for being a "Wild West" area, largely untouched by industrialization; even today there are relatively few factories in the province. Tourism plays an important part of Hainan's economy, thanks largely to its tropical beaches and lush forests. The central government has encouraged foreign investment in Hainan and has allowed the island to rely to a large extent on market forces.

Hainan's industrial development largely has been limited to the processing of its mineral and agricultural products, particularly rubber and iron ore. Since the 1950s, machinery, farm equipment, and textiles have been manufactured in the Haikou area for local consumption. A major constraint on industrial expansion has been an inadequate supply of electricity. Much of the island's generating capacity is hydroelectric, and it is subject to seasonal fluctuations in stream and river flows.

In December 2009, the government of China announced that it plans to establish Hainan as an "international tourist destination" by 2020. This announcement contributed to a surge in the province's economy, with a year-on-year increase in investment of 136.9% in the first three months of 2010. Hainan's real estate sector accounted for more than one third of the province's economic growth.

According to the Statistical Communiqué of National Economic and Social Development of the statistical authority, the GDP of Hainan Province in 2017 was 446.3 billion yuan (66.1 billion US dollars), up by 7.0 percent over the previous year. Of this total, the value added of the primary industry was 97.9 billion yuan (14.5 billion US dollars), up by 3.6 percent, that of the secondary industry was 99.7 billion yuan (14.8 billion US dollars), up by 2.7 percent and that of the tertiary industry was 248.6 billion yuan (36.8 billion US dollars), up by 10.2 percent. The value added of the primary industry accounted for 21.95 percent of the GDP; that of the secondary industry accounted for 22.34 percent; and that of the tertiary industry accounted for 55.71 percent. The per capita GDP in 2017 was 48,430 yuan (7,173 US dollars).

Agriculture

Owing to Hainan's tropical climate, paddy rice is cultivated extensively in the northeastern lowlands and in the southern mountain valleys. Leading crops other than rice include coconut, palm oil, sisal, tropical fruits (including pineapples, of which Hainan is China's leading producer), black pepper, coffee, tea, cashews, and sugarcane.

The hot Hainan yellow lantern chili, a variety similar to the scotch bonnet, is unique to the island, and is grown in the southeast and southwest.

The total tropical crop area of Hainan is 100,000 hectares.

Hainan is a major rubber producer. In the early 20th century Chinese emigrants returning from then British Malaya, introduced rubber trees to the island; after 1950, state farms were developed, and Hainan now produces a substantial amount of China's rubber. Natural rubber is now grown on 246,000 hectares of land. This ranks 6th in the world in harvest area and 5th in terms of output.

Hainan has almost 93,000 hectares of areca palms. The product, the areca nut, is consumed locally and also sent to the mainland. Ninety-five percent of China's production of this nut is produced in Hainan.

Domesticated farm animals comprise mainly goats, cows, water buffalo, chickens, geese and ducks.

Fisheries

Grouper, Spanish mackerel, and tuna constitute the bulk of the catch from offshore fishing grounds. Scallops and pearls are raised in shallow bays and basins for local use and export.

Shrimp production is estimated to have been  in 2007, more than 50% of which was exported. Hainan has over 400 hatcheries, most being located between Wenchang and Qionghai.

The island has an estimated 100,000 local, commercial fish farming families.

Tourism

Hainan Island is often divided into eight regions for tourism purposes: Haikou and area (Haikou, Qiongshan, Ding'an); the Northeast (Wenchang); the Central East Coast (Qionghai, Ding'an); the South East Coast; the South (Sanya); the West Coast also called the Chinese Riviera (Ledong, Dongfang, Xianghsui, Changjiang); the North West (Danzhou, Lingao, Chengmai); and the Central Highlands (Baisha, Qiongzhong, and Wuzhishan/Tongzha).

Popular tourist destinations include the beaches and resorts in the southern part of the province. Inland is Five Finger Mountain, a scenic area. Tourists also visit the capital of Haikou with area visitor attractions such as Movie Town Haikou and Holiday Beach.

Visa requirements

In 2000, the province initiated a visa-upon-arrival policy for foreign tourist groups. It is available to citizens of twenty-six different countries, and was established in order to attract visitors.

Beginning 1 May 2018, citizens of 59 countries will be able to visit Hainan for 30 days without requiring a visa, provided that they come on a tour via a travel agency. Countries included among the 59 are: Argentina, Australia, Austria, Belgium, Brazil, Canada, Chile, the Czech Republic, Denmark, Finland, France, Germany, Greece, Hungary, Iceland, Indonesia, Ireland, Italy, Japan, Kazakhstan, Malaysia, Mexico, the Netherlands, New Zealand, Norway, the Philippines, Poland, Portugal, Russia, Singapore, Spain, South Korea, Sweden, Switzerland, Thailand, UAE, Ukraine, the United Kingdom, and the United States.

Statistics
During 2008, 20.6 million tourists visited Hainan, producing total revenues of 19.23 billion yuan (US$2.81 billion). Of these tourists, 979,800 were from overseas with the largest numbers coming from South Korea, Russia and Japan.

In 2010, the amount of overnight tourists visiting Hainan was 25.87 million, 663,000 of which came from outside China.

During 2011, more than 30 million tourists visited Hainan, mostly from mainland China. Of the 814,600 overseas tourists, 227,600 of them came from Russia, a 53.3 percent a rise year-on-year. Total revenue during that year was 32 billion RMB ($4.3 billion US), up 25 percent from 2010.

In the first quarter of 2012, the Hainan Provincial Tourism Development Commission reports that Hainan received 208,300 overnight visitors, 25 percent of whom came from Russia.

In 2014, Hainan received 50.2 million tourists, 660,000 of whom were from overseas.

During 2015, Hainan received 53 million visitors.

In 2016, over 60 million tourists went to Hainan, up 12.9% from 2015.

During 2018, the province received over 76 million domestic and overseas tourists, a year-on-year increase of 11.8%. Revenue also increased 14.5% compared to the previous year for a total of 95 billion RMB (US$14 billion).

Medical tourism
The government of Hainan is expanding the province's medical tourism industry. The provincial government has established the Boao Lecheng International Medical Tourism Pilot Zone in the Bo'ao area. The zone is located six kilometers from the Boao Forum for Asia and covers 20 square kilometers. This was announced at the Boao Forum for Asia in 2011. The State Council has approved the development of Lecheng Island as a medical tourism-themed destination. Construction on the 20 km2. The zone was begun in December 2014 and will cost a projected 1.5 billion yuan. It was scheduled for completion in 2016 and is the first special zone for medical travel in China. As part of the zone, the Boao Super Hospital opened in 2018.

Historical sites

Haikou is the province's capital and contains interesting historic sites. Also known as Coconut City, Haikou is a major port. The Five Officials Temple consists of five traditional temples and halls that were built in honor of five officials of the Tang (618-907) and Song (960-1279) dynasties. These officials were banished to Hainan for periods ranging from 11 days to 11 years for speaking out against what they felt were wrong practices by the emperors. (It is perhaps significant that the establishment of the Five Officials Temple in the late 19th century coincides with a time when China's territorial integrity was under threat, and that several of the officials honored here were exiled for espousing aggressive policies on the recapture of the north of China from the Jurchens during the Southern Song dynasty.)

Xiuying Fort was built in 1891 to defend the southeastern corner of China during the Sino-French War. The Xiuying Fort Barbette covers about a third of an acre. Its five large cannons are still intact and viewable at the site.

The Tomb of Hai Rui is a key national cultural protection site. Hai Rui was a compassionate and popular official of Hainanese origins who lived during the Ming dynasty. He was famous for his lifelong honesty and his willingness to speak out on behalf of local people. In later life, Hai Rui was persecuted and fell out of favor with the emperor. His admirers built the Hai Rui Tomb after his death to commemorate his great works. Construction of the tomb began in 1589.

The Yangpu Ancient Salt Field is a heritage site in Yantian village on Yangpu Peninsula. The area comprises more than 1,000 stones, cut flat on top, used to dry seawater to produce salt.

Other attractions and destinations

Hainan Island has a number of beaches, hot springs and other attractions. Some top scenic sites include Yalong bay National Resort; Dadonghai Tourist Resort; Qizhi Shan (Seven Finger Mountain), Nuilin mountain tropical botanical reserve in Lingshui county, Guantang Hot Spring Resort, Shishan Volcanic Garden; the Wanquan River, Baishi Ridge Scenic Zone and Baihua Ridge.

Other attractions in Hainan include:
 Phoenix Island, an artificial island in Sanya Bay.
 Monkey Island, near the well-known perfume bay or Xiangshui Wan, a popular tourist destination located in Lingshui County, is a state-protected nature reserve for macaques.
 Xiangshui Bay Scenic Area,  from Sanya Tiandu.
 Nanshan Temple, a Buddhist cultural area west of Sanya featuring a  statue of Guanyin, Buddhist Goddess of Mercy.
 Yanoda is a rainforest area. It is open to visitors with guided walking tours, a zipline, and a waterfall climbing activity.

Yachting
To encourage the international yachting community, new regulations now allow foreign yachts to stay for a total of 183 days each year, with a maximum single stay duration of 30 days. 13 additional ports will be built around the island to accommodate this market.

Duty-free program
On 20 April 2011, a pilot duty-free program commenced with the aim of increasing luxury goods purchases. It permits domestic Chinese visitors to claim tax refunds on imported luxury items purchased within the province. The maximum value is set at 5,000 yuan (US$762), with lowered tax rates on purchases over 5,000 yuan. In October 2012, duty limits were raised to 8,000 yuan ($1,273), and became available to both domestic and international tourists.

The total sales of duty-free products for 2012 was 2.4 billion yuan.

The world's largest duty-free shopping complex is scheduled to open in Haitang Bay in August 2014.

During 2018 Spring Festival, Hainan recorded a 25% increase in duty-free revenue, with 450 million yuan ($71 million) in sales. The two duty-free shops, located in Sanya and Haikou, received about 99,000 customers, a 32% gain.

During 2018, the two duty-free shops had sales of more than 10 billion RMB and received 2.88 million customers.

Natural resources
Hainan has commercially exploitable reserves of more than 30 minerals. Iron, first mined by the Japanese during their occupation of the island in World War II, is the most important. Also important are titanium, manganese, tungsten, bauxite, molybdenum, cobalt, copper, gold, and silver. There are large deposits of lignite and oil shale on the island, and significant offshore finds of oil and natural gas have been discovered. Virgin forests in the interior mountains contain more than 20 commercially valuable species, including teak and sandalwood.

Real estate market
In 1990, Hainan province was the site of the largest property bust in modern Chinese history With 2009 and the announcement of the Chinese Government's plan to develop the province into a major international tourist location, property sales rose by 73%, creating the possibility of another bubble in Hainan's property market.

Since March 2010, commercial and residential property values in some parts of Hainan have slowed down since the market peaked in February.
However, property prices in the tourist resort of Sanya remain strong as of January 2011, with prime developments selling at prices of up to 80,000 RMB per square metre.

Data for 2016 data shows that Hainan saw an increase in house sales of 44%. Volume in sales was 129 billion RMB ($18.82 billion) which is a rise of 51.2 percent year-on-year. During that year in November, commercial apartments in Sanya sold for 20,695 RMB per square meter a rise of 15.75% year-on-year. The total amount of Sanya real estate sold during that time was 212,400 square meters.

Out of China's twenty leading real estate developers, eighteen had invested in Hainan during 2016.

In the beginning of 2017, the price for a house in Haikou was approximately 8,000 RMB ($1,170) per square meter and $20,000 RMB ($2,977) per square meter in Sanya.

New 2018 regulations
On 23 April 2018, new rules came into effect regarding home purchases in Hainan. To be able to buy a house, non-Hainan residents must prove that they have a minimum of one family member who has been paying taxes or social security for at least 2 years.

Those non-Hainan residents who wish to purchase a house in Haikou, Sanya and Qionghai must prove that they have a minimum of one family member who has been paying taxes or social security for at least 5 years.

In Wuzhishan, Baoting, Qiongzhong and Baisha (the "central ecological core areas"), houses may only be purchased by local residents.

When non-residents do buy a property, the down payment must be at least 70 per cent. In order to curb speculation, owners may not sell their property for five years after receiving their ownership certificate.

Golf industry

This industry is expanding in Hainan, with numerous courses being constructed, including Mission Hills Haikou, which is one of the largest golf complexes in the world. The golf industry attracts foreign investment and overseas golfers from such countries as Australia, South Korea, and Japan.

Automotive industry
Automotive manufacturing is one of Eight industrial pillar industries. Hainan's automotive output was 39,600 in 2017, down by 41.1 percent over the previous year. Domestic Chinese manufacturer, Haima Automobile has its global headquarters in Haikou.

Foreign trade

As of 2017, the total value of imports and exports of goods reached 70,237 million yuan (10,403 million US dollars). Of which, the value of goods exported was 29,566 million yuan (4,379 million US dollars), the value of goods imported was 40,671 million yuan (6,024 million US dollars).

Asean was Hainan's largest export trade partner in 2017, the value of goods exported to Asean was 12,289 yuan (1,820 million US dollars), accounted for 41.56 per cent of the total value of goods exported. Its second-largest foreign trade partner was Hong Kong, the value of goods exported to Hong Kong was 2,966 yuan (439 million US dollars), accounted for 10.03 per cent of that. the 3rd largest partner was EU, the value of goods exported to EU was 2,186 yuan (324 million US dollars), accounted for 7.39 per cent of that.

Hainan Free trade port
On 13 April 2018, Communist Party general secretary Xi Jinping announced a plan to gradually make the island into a pilot free trade zone by 2020, and transform the entire island into a free trade port by 2025. This will involve inviting foreign and multi-national companies to set up their regional and international headquarters in Hainan. Goods and services would be subject to low or even no tariffs. The zone will become China's largest free trade zone, and the first trade port since 1949, when the People's Republic of China was founded. Part of the plan is to establish exchanges in commodities and carbon trading, international energy, and shipping. Emphasis will also be placed on the development of service industries including tourism, the Internet, healthcare, finance, as well as conference and exhibitions hosting.

Since the announcement in April 2018, Hainan had signed 159 contracts with major companies. In September 2018, China National Travel Service Group, China's biggest travel business conglomerate, relocated its headquarters from Beijing to Haikou. In October 2018, Baidu and Hainan signed a deal to built a 10-billion-yuan (US$1.45 billion) eco-village.

In September 2018, a symposium was held in Beijing on foreign investment projects in Hainan. During that gathering, the Hainan government signed contracts with 26 international companies including Globevisa Group, Merlin Entertainments Group, Viacom, Ikea Group, Mapletree Investments, Avis Budget Group, Star Cruises, and Boehringer Ingelheim.

To bring talented workers to Hainan, in November 2018 the Hainan government held a recruitment fair in Beijing in an effort to bring 7,471 people to Hainan to work in government agencies, companies, and other institutions.

Established prior to this announcement, and currently in existence, are the following economic and technological development zones:
 Haikou Free Trade Zone
 Haikou New & Hi-Tech Industrial Development Zone
 Yangpu Economic Development Zone

In 2021, Hainan Free Trade Port Law of the People's Republic of China was adopted by the National People's Congress and ratified under the No.85 Order of the President of the People's Republic of China in 2021. According to the law, by 2025, feng guan (封关, which is directly translated into "customs closure") will be fully implemented and all goods sold to other parts of China from Hainan would be treated as imports, in a similar way as Hong Kong SAR.

Transport

Road
Before 1950 there were practically no transport links with the interior of the island. The first roads were built in the early 20th century, but no major road construction was undertaken in the mountains until the 1950s. Parallel north–south roads along the east and west coasts and through the interior of the island constitute most of Hainan's road network.

Hainan is the only province in China that does not have highway toll stations. This is due to the 1994 "fee-to-tax" reform. Instead, road maintenance costs are raised through a 60% tax on fuel.

There are several major highways and expressways linking Haikou on the north coast with Sanya on the south coast. The G224 is 309 kilometers long and runs through the middle of the province. For most of its length, the G225 runs parallel to the Hainan western ring railway. The G223 is the eastern part, running from Haikou to Sanya. It is 323 kilometers long. The G98 is a 612.8-kilometer-long orbital expressway that encircles the island. Hainan Highway 1, a new 1,040-km-long scenic highway, will be built around the island, along the coast starting in May 2019.

There are also numerous rural roads within the province. These are typically two-way asphalt roads and connect larger towns. Connecting the thousands of villages to one another and to farms, are concrete roads about 6 meters wide. Many of these were built from roughly from the year 2000 onward, and as of 2019, are still being built.

Bridges

While a bridge connecting Hainan to the Leizhou peninsula on the mainland was planned in the early 2000s it never came to fruition. A bridge or tunnel received continued consideration in 2018, as travel by air or ferry can leave residents and visitors isolated when bad weather sets in.

Air
Hainan Province has two international airports (Haikou Meilan International Airport and Sanya Phoenix International Airport) and two domestic airports (Qionghai Bo'ao Airport and Danzhou Airport, the latter is under construction.)

Rail

Today's Hainan is ringed by standard-gauge railways. Since 2004, a rail ferry connects the island's railroad network to Guangdong, mainland China. In 2005, Ministry of Communications allocated 20 million yuan (US$2.4 million) to set up a committee to research and study the possibility of a bridge or tunnel link connecting the island to the mainland. From the ferry terminal, located near Haikou railway station (west of Haikou), freight and passenger trains arriving from the mainland can proceed on the Hainan western ring railway along the island's west coast, via Dongfang to Sanya. This railway line has been developed over several decades, starting with a few short  narrow gauge lines constructed during the Japanese occupation in the early 1940s.

There is a high-speed railway ring around the island, formed by the eastern ring and western ring along the island's coast. Both high-speed railways are connected with Haikou and Sanya. There are 15 stations along the east coast, and 16 stations along the west coast. The first eastern ring high-speed train run started on 30 December 2010, and the Hainan western ring high-speed railway started its operation in 2015.

Seaports

 Haikou Xiuying Port serves as the main passenger and cargo center.
 Haikou New Port opened 1 June 2005
 Macun Port located in Chengmai County; opened 1 June 2005
 Hainan Strait Port
 Basuo Port in Dongfang City is a small port on the west coast of Hainan. One of its main cargos is iron ore from the Shilu Mine.

Hainan received 11,000 tons of products via ports November 2010, up 90.1 percent month-on-month. Between January and November 2010, 102,000 tons of products were exported via Hainan, 34,000 tons of which were exported to the US, and 14,000 tons sent to the EU.

Education

The level of primary and secondary education has improved since 1949, but facilities for higher education remain somewhat inadequate.

Hainan University
Hainan Medical University
Hainan Normal University
Hainan Tropical Ocean University
Qiongtai Normal University
Haikou University of Economics
University of Sanya

Culture

As a frontier region celebrated by such exiled poets as Su Dongpo, Hainan acquired an air of mystery and romance. The influx of large numbers of mainlanders after 1950 – particularly in the 1970s, when young Chinese from southern Guangdong were assigned to state farms to help develop Hainan, and in the 1980s, when thousands more came to take advantage of the economic opportunities offered – has perpetuated the frontier atmosphere on the island.

Media
As well as programs from Central China Television (CCTV), Hainan has a number of local TV stations including Hainan TV and Haikou TV. The Chinese language Nanguo Metropolis Daily, Haikou Evening News, and Hainan Daily newspapers are published in Haikou.

A large film studio is located in the south part of Haikou. Movie Town Haikou comprises several studio buildings and an artificial town used as filming sets and a visitor attraction.

Cuisine

Hainan cuisine is said to be "lighter, with mild seasonings." A lot of local taste is mixed with the Han Chinese taste. Seafood predominates the menu, as shrimp, crab, fish and other sea life are widely available.

Wenchang chicken is a dish known throughout the province of Hainan. Although there are many varieties of this dish, the name is usually used to define a type of small, free-range chicken from Wenchang, located on the east coast of the province. As opposed to battery chickens, its meat has more texture and is somewhat drier.

Hainan chicken rice / Coibui is a famous dish in Southeast Asia, particularly Singapore and Malaysia,  bearing the region's name. However, while many restaurants use chicken fat to quickly add flavor to the dish, the proper local method is to 'marinate' the rice with chicken soup to add a more full flavor.

Events
Numerous events are hosted or sponsored on the island, including:
 Swatch Girls World Pro China - Annual Elite Women's surfing competition, held at Wanning
 Hainan International Surfing Festival, held annually at Riyue Bay, Wanning
 Miss World beauty pageant is regularly held in the city of Sanya.
 Mission Hills Star Trophy is an annual golf tournament that started in 2010.
 Tour of Hainan bicycle race
 Hainan Rendez-Vous, an annual four-day event that draws China's ultra high-net-worth individuals to the Chinese Riviera-like shores of Hainan
 Ironman triathlon
 Boao Forum for Asia, held in Boao, is an international high-level government, business, and academia forum.
 H1 Hot Air Balloon Challenge is held annually in Haikou. Balloons from across the nation fly over the Qiongzhou Strait from Haikou to a designated location on the mainland in Xunwen County, Guangdong.

Miscellaneous topics
The novel, Red Detachment of Women, by Liang Xin, was set in Hainan. The novel was first adapted to a feature film in the 1950s, and then a ballet in the 1960s as one of the Eight model plays. Most of the people of that time derived their romanticized image of Hainan Island from the scenes in the ballet, particularly that of the vivid forests of coconut trees, the Five Finger Mountain (Wuzhi Shan), and the Wanquan River.
Two notable lighthouses are located on Hainan: the Baishamen Lighthouse and Mulantou Lighthouse are among the tallest in the world, the latter being the tallest in China.
3024 Hainan, named after the province, is an outer main-belt asteroid discovered in 1981.
Hainan Kopi Tales is a Singaporean Chinese drama serial set in a famous Hainan coffee shop that explores the Hainanese way of life from the 1960s to the 1980s.
Hainan Resort is also a multiplayer map in the 2013 video game Battlefield 4.

Space center

One of China's satellite launch centers is located in Hainan east of the city of Wenchang. The Wenchang Satellite Launch Center, a  facility, is the closest Chinese launch center to the equator. The construction plan was first announced in October 2007. The new launch center began operations on 3 November 2016 with the Long March 5 rocket making its maiden flight.

Notable residents
The poet Su Shi (1036–1101) popularized Hainan's isolation and exoticism when he was exiled there under the Song dynasty. The Dongpo Academy was built on the site of the residence where he lived in exile.

Hai Rui (1514–1587) was a famous Chinese official of the Ming dynasty. His name has come down in history as a model of honesty and integrity in office.

Chih-Ping Chen (1906-1983) was a distinguished diplomat and statesman for the Republic of China, who served to build the Yunnan-Burma Road, and a diplomatic career that spanned four decades.

The most well-known native of Hainan is Chinese businessman, Charlie Soong, father of the Shanghai-born Soong sisters: Soong Ai-ling, wife of H. H. Kung (once China's richest man); Soong Ching-ling, wife of Sun Yat-Sen; and Soong Mei-ling, wife of former ROC President Chiang Kai-shek.

Wang Feifei (Fei), singer, actress, entertainer and member of girl group Miss A;

Wu Xuanyi, member of the South Korean-Chinese girl group WJSN

International partnership
Hainan has international relationships with the following places:

See also 

 List of islands of China
 Hainan Island incident
 Sanya

Note

References

Further reading
 D'Arcy Brown, Liam (2003). Green Dragon, Sombre Warrior: travels to China's extremes. London: John Murray. 
 Edmonds, Richard Louis. "Hainan province and its impact on the geography of China", Geography, Vol. 74, No. 2 (April 1989), pp. 165–169

External links

 Hainan Government website (English) 
 Hainan Government website (Chinese)
 Economic profile for Hainan at HKTDC
 Dr Howard M Scott "Hainan"
 Resources on the Hainanese in the National Library of Singapore
 Learn Hainanese Website 
 Hainan Province Official English Language Tourism Website 

 
.
1988 establishments in China
Gulf of Tonkin
Islands of China
Islands of Hainan
Islands of the South China Sea
Provinces of the People's Republic of China
States and territories established in 1988
Territorial disputes of the Republic of China